Anthony Boheme (died 1731) was a British stage actor of the eighteenth century.

His year of birth is unknown. From 1720 he was a long-standing part of John Rich's company at the Lincoln's Inn Fields Theatre until his death. He was married to the actress Anna Maria Seymour.

Selected roles
 Lord Cobham in Sir Walter Raleigh (1719)
 French Bishop in Henry IV of France (1719)
 Jaspar in The Half-Pay Officers (1720)
 Aspar in The Imperial Captives (1720)
 Nicanor in Antiochus (1721)
 Haly in The Fair Captive (1721)
 Lord Gracebubble in The Chimera (1721)
 Courtney in Fatal Extravagance (1721)
 Weighty in The Compromise (1722)
 O'Brien in Hibernia Freed (1722)
 Danaus in Love and Duty (1722)
 Eteocles in The Fatal Legacy (1723)
 Herod in Mariamne (1723)
 Edwin in Edwin (1724)
 Paulinus in The Roman Maid (1724)
 Belisarius in Belisarius (1724)
 Wiseman in The Bath Unmasked (1725)
 Don Manuel in Money the Mistress (1726)
 Sicoris in The Fall of Saguntum (1727)
 Omar in Sesostris (1728)
 Phraotes in The Virgin Queen (1728)
 Plowdon in The Wife of Bath (1730)

References

Bibliography
 Highfill, Philip H, Burnim, Kalman A. & Langhans, Edward A. A Biographical Dictionary of Actors, Actresses, Musicians, Dancers, Managers, and Other Stage Personnel in London, 1660-1800: Garrick to Gyngell. SIU Press, 1978.
 Straub, Kristina, G. Anderson, Misty and O'Quinn, Daniel . The Routledge Anthology of Restoration and Eighteenth-Century Drama. Taylor & Francis,  2017.

18th-century English people
English male stage actors
British male stage actors
18th-century English male actors
18th-century British male actors
Year of birth unknown
1731 deaths